The Winchester Model 62 is a slide-action repeating rifle produced by the Winchester Repeating Arms Company in the early 20th century.

The gun replaced the Model 1906. It was a take-down rifle that was able to accept most .22 caliber rimfire cartridges, specifically .22 Short, .22 Long, and .22 Long Rifle.

Around serial number 98000 (1940) minor changes in the mechanism lead to the model designation 62A. They remained in production until 1958.

References

Winchester Repeating Arms Company firearms
Rifles of the United States